Hugh Caperton (April 17, 1781 – February 9, 1847) was an American politician and planter from Virginia. He was the father of Allen Taylor Caperton whom he had with his wife Jane Erskine Caperton.

Biography
Born in Greenbrier County, Virginia (now West Virginia), Caperton was a planter and engaged in mercantile pursuits as a young man. He moved to Monroe County, Virginia which he became sheriff of in 1805 and became a member of the Virginia House of Delegates in 1810, serving until 1813. He was elected a Federalist to the United States House of Representatives in 1812, serving from 1813 to 1815 and later returned to the House of Delegates from 1826 to 1830. Caperton resumed engaging in agricultural and mercantile pursuits until his death at his estate called "Elmwood" near Union, Virginia (now West Virginia) on February 9, 1847. He was interred at Green Hill Cemetery in Union.

"Elmwood" was listed on the National Register of Historic Places in 1976.

1813 election

Caperton was elected to the U.S. House of Representatives with 100% of the vote, defeating Republican Ballard Smith.

References

External links

 

1781 births
1847 deaths
Members of the Virginia House of Delegates
Farmers from Virginia
Virginia sheriffs
People from Monroe County, West Virginia
American planters
American slave owners
People from Greenbrier County, West Virginia
Federalist Party members of the United States House of Representatives from Virginia
Caperton family of Virginia and West Virginia
Businesspeople from Virginia
19th-century American politicians